Karpatiosorbus (Synonymy: Sorbus subgenus Tormaria Májovsky & Bernátová = S. subgenus Aria x subgenus Torminaria) is a genus of flowering plants in the family Rosaceae, native to Europe, including Crimea, and Algeria. Shrubs or small trees, they appear to have arisen via hybridization events between the clades Aria (Pers.) Host and Torminalis Medik. Many of its species propagate solely by apomixis.

The genus name of Karpatiosorbus is in honour of Zoltán Kárpáti (1909–1972), who was a Hungarian (Geo-)Botanist, Taxonomist, Dendrologist and specialist in Sorbus (from central Europe).

The genus was circumscribed by Alexander Nikolaevitsch Sennikov and Arto Kurtto in Memoranda Soc. Fauna Fl. Fenn.
vol.93 on page 46 in 2017.

Species
Currently accepted species include:

Karpatiosorbus acutiserrata (C.Németh) Sennikov & Kurtto
Karpatiosorbus adamii (Kárpáti) Sennikov & Kurtto
Karpatiosorbus adeana (N.Mey.) Sennikov & Kurtto
Karpatiosorbus admonitor (M.Proctor) Sennikov & Kurtto
Karpatiosorbus albensis (M.Lepší, Boublík, P.Lepší & Vít) Sennikov & Kurtto
Karpatiosorbus alnifrons (Kovanda) Sennikov & Kurtto
Karpatiosorbus amici-petri (Mikoláš) Sennikov & Kurtto
Karpatiosorbus andreanszkyana (Kárpáti) Sennikov & Kurtto
Karpatiosorbus badensis (Düll) Sennikov & Kurtto
Karpatiosorbus bakonyensis (Jáv.) Sennikov & Kurtto
Karpatiosorbus balatonica (Kárpáti) Sennikov & Kurtto
Karpatiosorbus barabitsii (C.Németh) Sennikov & Kurtto
Karpatiosorbus barrandienica (Vít, M.Lepší & P.Lepší) Sennikov & Kurtto
Karpatiosorbus barthae (Kárpáti) Sennikov & Kurtto
Karpatiosorbus bodajkensis (Barabits) Sennikov & Kurtto
Karpatiosorbus bohemica (Kovanda) Sennikov & Kurtto
Karpatiosorbus borosiana (Kárpáti) Sennikov & Kurtto
Karpatiosorbus bristoliensis (Wilmott) Sennikov & Kurtto
Karpatiosorbus cochleariformis (Meierott) Sennikov & Kurtto
Karpatiosorbus concavifolia (C.Németh) Sennikov & Kurtto
Karpatiosorbus cordigastensis (N.Mey.) Sennikov & Kurtto
Karpatiosorbus croceocarpa (P.D.Sell) Sennikov & Kurtto
Karpatiosorbus decipientiformis (Kárpáti) Sennikov & Kurtto
Karpatiosorbus degenii (Jáv.) Sennikov & Kurtto
Karpatiosorbus devoniensis (E.F.Warb.) Sennikov & Kurtto
Karpatiosorbus dolomiticola (Mikoláš) Sennikov & Kurtto
Karpatiosorbus dominii (Kárpáti) Sennikov & Kurtto
Karpatiosorbus dracofolia (C.Németh) Sennikov & Kurtto
Karpatiosorbus eugenii-kelleri (Kárpáti) Sennikov & Kurtto
Karpatiosorbus eximia (Kovanda) Sennikov & Kurtto
Karpatiosorbus eystettensis (N.Mey.) Sennikov & Kurtto
Karpatiosorbus fischeri (N.Mey.) Sennikov & Kurtto
Karpatiosorbus franconica (Bornm.) Sennikov & Kurtto
Karpatiosorbus futakiana (Kárpáti) Sennikov & Kurtto
Karpatiosorbus gayeriana (Kárpáti) Sennikov & Kurtto
Karpatiosorbus gemella (Kovanda) Sennikov & Kurtto
Karpatiosorbus gerecseensis (Boros & Kárpáti) Sennikov & Kurtto
Karpatiosorbus haesitans (Meierott) Sennikov & Kurtto
Karpatiosorbus herbipolitana (Meierott) Sennikov & Kurtto
Karpatiosorbus holubyana (Kárpáti) Sennikov & Kurtto
Karpatiosorbus hoppeana (N.Mey.) Sennikov & Kurtto
Karpatiosorbus houstoniae (T.C.G.Rich) Sennikov & Kurtto
Karpatiosorbus hybrida (Borkh.) Sennikov & Kurtto
Karpatiosorbus joannis (Kárpáti) Sennikov & Kurtto
Karpatiosorbus karpatii (Boros) Sennikov & Kurtto
Karpatiosorbus klasterskyana (Kárpáti) Sennikov & Kurtto
Karpatiosorbus kmetiana (Kárpáti) Sennikov & Kurtto
Karpatiosorbus latifolia (Lam.) Sennikov & Kurtto
Karpatiosorbus magocsyana (Kárpáti) Sennikov & Kurtto
Karpatiosorbus meierottii (N.Mey.) Sennikov & Kurtto
Karpatiosorbus mergenthaleriana (N.Mey.) Sennikov & Kurtto
Karpatiosorbus meyeri (S.Hammel & Haynold) Sennikov & Kurtto
Karpatiosorbus milensis (M.Lepší, Boublík, P.Lepší & Vít) Sennikov & Kurtto
Karpatiosorbus omissa (Velebil) Sennikov & Kurtto
Karpatiosorbus paxiana (Jáv.) Sennikov & Kurtto
Karpatiosorbus pelsoensis (C.Németh) Sennikov & Kurtto
Karpatiosorbus perlonga (Meierott) Sennikov & Kurtto
Karpatiosorbus polgariana (C.Németh) Sennikov & Kurtto
Karpatiosorbus portae-bohemicae (M.Lepší, Boublík, P.Lepší & Vít) Sennikov & Kurtto
Karpatiosorbus pseudobakonyensis (Kárpáti) Sennikov & Kurtto
Karpatiosorbus pseudolatifolia (Boros) Sennikov & Kurtto
Karpatiosorbus pseudosemi-incisa (Boros) Sennikov & Kurtto
Karpatiosorbus pseudovertesensis (Boros) Sennikov & Kurtto
Karpatiosorbus puellarum (Meierott) Sennikov & Kurtto
Karpatiosorbus ratisbonensis (N.Mey.) Sennikov & Kurtto
Karpatiosorbus redliana (Kárpáti) Sennikov & Kurtto
Karpatiosorbus remensis (Cornier) Sennikov & Kurtto
Karpatiosorbus rhodanthera (Kovanda) Sennikov & Kurtto
Karpatiosorbus rhombiformis (C.Németh) Sennikov & Kurtto
Karpatiosorbus schnizleiniana (N.Mey.) Sennikov & Kurtto
Karpatiosorbus schuwerkiorum (N.Mey.) Sennikov & Kurtto
Karpatiosorbus sellii (T.C.G.Rich) Sennikov & Kurtto
Karpatiosorbus semi-incisa (Borbás) Sennikov & Kurtto
Karpatiosorbus seyboldiana (S.Hammel & Haynold) Sennikov & Kurtto
Karpatiosorbus simonkaiana (Kárpáti) Sennikov & Kurtto
Karpatiosorbus slovenica (Kovanda) Sennikov & Kurtto
Karpatiosorbus subcuneata (Wilmott) Sennikov & Kurtto
Karpatiosorbus tauricola (Zaik. ex Sennikov) Sennikov & Kurtto
Karpatiosorbus tobani (C.Németh) Sennikov & Kurtto
Karpatiosorbus udvardyana (Somlyay & Sennikov) Sennikov & Kurtto
Karpatiosorbus vallerubusensis (C.Németh) Sennikov & Kurtto
Karpatiosorbus vallusensis (C.Németh) Sennikov & Kurtto
Karpatiosorbus vertesensis (Boros) Sennikov & Kurtto
Karpatiosorbus veszpremensis (Barabits) Sennikov & Kurtto
Karpatiosorbus zertovae (Kárpáti) Sennikov & Kurtto

References

Rosaceae genera